Celtica may refer to:

 Gallia Celtica, region of ancient Gaul inhabited by Celts
 Celtica (plant), genus of grasses in the tribe Stipeae
 Celtica (journal), academic journal devoted to Celtic studies
 Celtica (visitor centre), heritage attraction at Machynlleth, Powys, Wales, from 1995 to 2006
 Celtica Radio, radio station based in Bridgend, Wales
 Salsa Celtica, group that plays salsa music with traditional Scottish instruments
 Studia Celtica, scholarly linguistics journal based in Wales

See also
 Celtic (disambiguation)